Sougoumba is a small town and seat (chef-lieu) of the commune of Koningué in the Cercle of Koutiala in the Sikasso Region of southern Mali. The town is about 40 km southeast of Koutiala.

References

Populated places in Sikasso Region